Raw is the second studio album by American rapper Hopsin. The album was released on November 19, 2010, through Funk Volume. The album contains guest appearances from rappers SwizZz and Cryptic Wisdom. Like its predecessors, the album's production was entirely handled by Hopsin himself.

Raw was supported by two singles, "Nocturnal Rainbows" and "Sag My Pants". Despite the release of the previous album, Gazing at the Moonlight, Hopsin considers Raw as his debut album. Upon release it peaked at number 46 on the Billboard Heatseekers Albums chart.

Singles
"Nocturnal Rainbows" was released as the album's lead single on August 1, 2010.

"Sag My Pants" was released as the album's second single on October 8, 2010. On the song, Hopsin disses rappers Drake, Lil Wayne, Soulja Boy and Lupe Fiasco. He also disses the widowed wife of Eazy-E, Tomica Wright, vowing that he'll 'make sure no one signs with Ruthless Records again.

Track listing
All tracks produced by Hopsin

Charts

References

2010 albums
Hopsin albums
Funk Volume albums